Bobby La Rue Thompson (November 3, 1953 – April 25, 2011) was an outfielder in Major League Baseball, playing mainly at centerfield for the Texas Rangers during the  season. Listed at 5' 11", 175 lb., Thompson was a switch-hitter and threw right-handed. He was born in Charlotte, North Carolina.

Following his graduation from Harding University High School, Thompson became the first African American born in Charlotte to join the Major Leagues. He was selected by the Texas Rangers in the 1972 amateur draft, and played six years in the Rangers Minor league system before joining the big team on April 16, 1978.

In his only major league season, Thompson served as a reserve outfielder for Al Oliver, Juan Beníquez and Bobby Bonds, being also used in pinch-hitting and pinch-running duties while appearing in 64 games. He hit for a .225 average (27-for-120), including three doubles, three triples, two home runs and seven stolen bases, while driving in 12 runs and scoring 23 times.  He played his last game on September 25. In a six-season minor league career, he hit .273 and 29 home runs in 520 games.

Thompson died at his residence in Charlotte at the age of 57.

Sources

External links
, or Pura Pelota (Venezuelan Winter League)

1953 births
2011 deaths
African-American baseball players
American expatriate baseball players in Mexico
Baseball players from Charlotte, North Carolina
Gastonia Rangers players
Geneva Senators players
Lynchburg Rangers players
Major League Baseball outfielders
Navegantes del Magallanes players
American expatriate baseball players in Venezuela
Petroleros de Poza Rica players
Petroleros de Zulia players
Richmond Braves players
Sacramento Solons players
San Antonio Brewers players
Texas Rangers players
Toledo Mud Hens players
Tucson Toros players
20th-century African-American sportspeople
21st-century African-American people